Archibald Heron (29 August 1896 – 10 May 1971) was an Irish Labour Party politician and trade unionist.

He was born in Portadown, County Armagh, to a presbyterian family, one of seven children of Samuel Heron, a physician and surgeon, and his wife Bessie (née Beck). He was educated locally before moving to Belfast in 1912. He joined the Irish Republican Brotherhood, and moved to Dublin in 1912 where he became involved in the Irish Transport and General Workers' Union.

He was elected to Dáil Éireann as a Labour Party Teachta Dála (TD) for the Dublin North-West constituency at the 1937 general election. He lost his seat at the 1938 general election. He was unsuccessful in both the 1927 general elections in Sligo–Leitrim.

He was a longtime member of Dublin's United Arts Club. He married Ina Connolly, daughter of the socialist republican revolutionary James Connolly. He served as a bodyguard for Michael Collins during the Irish War of Independence.

References

People from County Armagh
1896 births
1971 deaths
Labour Party (Ireland) TDs
Members of the 9th Dáil
Irish trade unionists